Thanks for Waiting is an album by Seven Nations released in 2005 on Moriath Records.

Track listing
Intro
One Foot
Ordinary
Miracle
Tradition
Waltz for Crystele
Somthin Somthin
Drive
Instrumental
It's Alright
Like Running Away
Reno
Slow Aire
Gun Song
The Water's Wide
Outro

Seven Nations (band) albums
2005 albums